Gavin McRae (born 24 March 1965) is a New Zealand cricketer. He played in 3 first-class and 31 List A matches for Central Districts from 1992 to 1996.

See also
 List of Central Districts representative cricketers

References

External links
 

1965 births
Living people
New Zealand cricketers
Central Districts cricketers
Cricketers from Blenheim, New Zealand